LuAnn Thompson is the Walters Endowed Professor at the University of Washington. She is known for her work in modeling the movement of heat and chemicals via ocean currents.

Education and career 
Thompson grew up in northern California and was interested in astrophysics. She received a B.S. in physics from the University of California, Davis (1983), an M.A. in physics from Harvard University (1986), and a Ph.D. from Massachusetts Institute of Technology and the Woods Hole Oceanographic Institution (1990). Following her Ph.D. she moved to the University of Washington first as a post-doctoral fellow, and then she joined the faculty in 1993. She was promoted to professor in 2010 and named the Walters Professor of Oceanography in 2016.

Research 
Thompson's early research developed models of water flow and used laboratory experiments to examine the production of eddies. Subsequent research examined the factors controlling sea surface height, which she measures using data from satellites, and the physical conditions in the ocean that lead to the formation of water masses. Through collaborative projects she has examined how changes in water circulation alter the oxygen levels in seawater and how marine heatwaves will impact marine ecosystems. In ongoing policy discussions, Thompson seeks to use science to support discussions on climate change and analyzes factors limiting promotion of women in science.

Selected publications

Awards and honors 
Thompson was named a fellow of the American Meteorological Society in 2014.

References

External links 

 
 More Than Scientists Collection of videos on scientists discussing climate change

University of California, Davis alumni
Harvard University alumni
Massachusetts Institute of Technology alumni
University of Washington faculty
American oceanographers
Women climatologists
Year of birth missing (living people)
Living people